Maldoror may refer to:

Maldoror (album), a solo album by American cellist Erik Friedlander
Maldoror (band), a music project consisting of Mike Patton and Masami Akita
Maldoror (record label)
Sarah Maldoror (1929−2020), a French filmmaker
Les Chants de Maldoror, a 19th-century French poetic novel